Emma LeDoux (September 10, 1875 - July 6, 1941) was the first woman sentenced to death in the State of California. She had been convicted of murdering Albert McVicar, her third husband, whom she had poisoned and stuffed into a steamer trunk then had the trunk delivered to a Stockton railway station on March 24, 1906. Upon appeal, she was granted a retrial where she pleaded guilty and was sentenced to life imprisonment.

Early life 

Born Emma Theresa Cole on September 10, 1875, in Pine Grove, California, her parents were Thomas Jefferson Cole from Ione, California, and Mary Ann Gardner.  The family moved to Oregon when Emma was around three years old, and returned to Amador County in 1888.

Marriages 
At age 16 (in 1892 or 1893), she married her first husband but they were divorced in 1898. Subsequently,  she married William Williams, a miner, who died of gastroenteritis in 1902. Within a few months of her second husband's death, she married Albert McVicar. While McVicar was enamored with his wife, she was not, and they separated though did not divorce. In August 1905, she married Jean LeDoux without revealing she was still married to her third husband, Albert McVicar, thus she committed bigamy.

Trunk murder of 1906
On March 24, 1906, the body of Albert McVicar, Emma's third husband, was found in a steamer trunk that was left on the platform of the Stockton Train Depot. Emma had purchased the trunk earlier at a store in Stockton, while she and Albert were staying at lodgings in town. Emma poisoned Albert with morphine, and then physically assaulted him and stuffed him in the trunk while he was still alive. He died in the trunk. She hired someone to take the trunk to the train depot and gave orders to have it shipped to Jamestown, California, but she failed to put the tag on the trunk before she took a train to San Francisco, so the trunk remained on the platform all day. The baggage master summoned the authorities when the trunk began to have an odor. Police obtained a warrant; the trunk was opened, revealing McVicar's body.

Sheriff Sibley from Stockton along with Constable John Whelehan, of Arlington, searched for Emma, apprehending her at the Arlington Hotel in Arlington, California. When the constable approached her, Emma stated, “I know what you want with me, and I will go with you.” 

Emma was a bigamist, being married to both McVicar and Jean LeDoux of Sutter Creek at the same time. Emma had married McVicar three months after her second husband, William S. Williams died under suspicious circumstances in Cochise County, Arizona. Nitric acid poisoning was suspected in that death. Emma was beneficiary of Williams's life insurance policy, gaining at least $4,000 upon his death.  

The trial of Emma LeDoux was postponed temporarily because of the 1906 San Francisco earthquake. She was convicted of first degree murder, and became the first woman to receive a death sentence in the State of California. Her hanging was scheduled for October 19 at San Quentin Prison; however, she received a stay of execution, and remained in jail until 1909.

In 1910, a new trial was granted, but being in poor health, she decided to plead guilty. She was sentenced to life imprisonment and was transferred to San Quentin, where she served 10 years before being paroled in 1920. On April 21, 1931 she was returned to prison for parole violations, where she remained for the rest of her life.

She died on July 6, 1941, and is buried in the Union Cemetery in Bakersfield, California.

In popular culture 
The steamer trunk used by LeDoux in the  murder of Albert McVicar is on display at the Haggin Museum in Stockton.

References 

1875 births
1941 deaths
1906 murders in the United States
American people convicted of murder
People convicted of murder by California
Criminals from California
Murderers for life insurance money